Bléniméouin (also spelled Bléni-Wé-Win) is a town in western Ivory Coast. It is a sub-prefecture of Bangolo Department in Guémon Region, Montagnes District.

Bléniméouin was a commune until March 2012, when it became one of 1126 communes nationwide that were abolished.

In 2014, the population of the sub-prefecture of Bléniméouin was 23,979.

Villages
The 3 villages of the sub-prefecture of Bléniméouin and their population in 2014 are:
 Bléniméouin (15 189)
 Diébly (3 494)
 Zaodrou (5 296)

Notes

Sub-prefectures of Guémon
Former communes of Ivory Coast